Eddy Merckx in the Vicinity of a Cup of Coffee (original title: Eddy Merckx i nærheden af en kop kaffe) is a 1973 Danish experimental short film by Jørgen Leth. It was produced by Stig Crab Barfoed and Charlotte Strandgaard and is 29 minutes long.

Concept
The film features Leth reading pieces of poetry in a TV studio, followed by footage from the 1970 Tour de France contest depicting cyclists Eddy Merckx and Walter Godefroot. The music is by Antonio Carlos Jobim.

References

External links
 

1973 television films
1973 films
Danish short films
Danish avant-garde and experimental films
1970s avant-garde and experimental films
Danish black-and-white films
Films about poets
Cycling films
1970 Tour de France
Cultural depictions of Eddy Merckx
Films directed by Jørgen Leth